Better Than Heaven is the debut studio album by American singer Stacey Q, released on October 17, 1986 by Atlantic Records. Produced by Jon St. James, Better Than Heaven is predominantly a dance-pop album with elements of Hi-NRG, freestyle and new wave music. She collaborated with the same line-up of musicians with whom she had previously performed in the band SSQ. They later continued to work on her other solo albums, Hard Machine (1988) and Nights Like This (1989).

Released during the rise of popularity of the lead single, "Two of Hearts", Better Than Heaven received generally positive reviews from music critics and peaked at number 59 on the Billboard 200. 

Three singles from the album were released. The lead single "Two of Hearts" peaked at number three on the Billboard Hot 100 and also did well on the Hot Dance Club Songs, landing at number four. It became one of the highest-selling singles of 1986, selling over one million copies. The second single, "We Connect", was also successful in charts, peaking at number 35 on the Billboard Hot 100 and number 14 on the Hot Dance Club Songs. Stacey Q performed both songs on the television series The Facts of Life where she guest starred as Cinnamon, an aspiring singer.

On 16 September 2022, "Better Than Heaven" was re-released with bonus remixes and extra tracks through Cherry Pop Records.



Track listing

Credits and personnel

SSQ
 Stacey Q
 Skip Hahn
 Karl Moet
 Rich West
 Jon St. James

Production
 Frank Del Rio - associate producer (track 7)
 William J. Walker :- associate producer (track 1)
 Jeff C. Fishman - associate producer (track 1)
 Willie Wilcox - associate producer (track 2), additional synth programming
 Keith Cowen - production coordinator
 Kirk Henry - production assistance
 Nancy Wendland - production assistance
 Keith Zajic - production assistance
 Gary Mraz - additional synth programming
 Dave Sitz - additional synth programming
 Dave Guccione - additional synth programming
 Aaron Rapoport - photography
 Danny Mendellin - hair & make-up
 Ed Jensen - hair & make-up
 Charlotte McGinnes - hair & make-up
 Tish & Gina - band stylists
 Jodi Rovin - design
 Barry Diament - CD mastering

Charts and certifications
 These are the peak positions and certifications from chart providers.

References

External links
 [ Better Than Heaven] at AllMusic
 

1986 debut albums
Atlantic Records albums
Stacey Q albums